2010 Liberty Bowl can refer to:

 2010 Liberty Bowl (January), played as part of the 2009–10 college football bowl season between the Arkansas Razorbacks and East Carolina Pirates.
 2010 Liberty Bowl (December), played as part of the 2010–11 college football bowl season between the Georgia Bulldogs and UCF Knights.